William Avery Rockefeller Jr. (May 31, 1841 – June 24, 1922) was an American businessman and financier. Rockefeller was a co-founder of Standard Oil along with his elder brother John Davison Rockefeller. He was also part owner of the Anaconda Copper Company, which was the fourth-largest company in the world in the late 1920s. He was a prominent member of the Rockefeller family.

Early years
William Jr. was born in Richford, New York. He was the middle son of con artist William Avery Rockefeller Sr. and Eliza Davison. In addition to elder brother John, William Jr.'s siblings were Lucy, Mary, and twins Franklin (Frank) and Frances (who died young). He also had two elder half-sisters, Clorinda (who died young) and Cornelia, through his father's affairs with mistress and housekeeper Nancy Brown. In 1853 his family moved to Strongsville, Ohio. As a young pupil in public school, he was inspired and motivated by his teacher-mentor, Rufus Osgood Mason, whom Rockefeller later named "A Rockefeller Patron."

Business career
At the age of sixteen, he began work as a clerk for a miller in Cleveland, Ohio. About two years later, he joined his older brother's produce commission business, Clark and Rockefeller, which later supplied provisions to the Union Army.

Oil business

Rockefeller was very adept in business matters. When John D. formed Rockefeller, Andrews & Flagler in 1867, he invited William to take charge of the company's export business in New York. In 1867, William Rockefeller and Co. was formed as a subsidiary to Rockefeller and Andrews. In 1870, that company became Standard Oil. In 1911 Standard Oil of New Jersey was split up by the United States Supreme Court.

Copper mining
In 1899, Rockefeller joined fellow Standard Oil principal Henry H. Rogers in forming the Amalgamated Copper Mining Company, a holding company that intended to control the copper industry. Rockefeller, along with Henry Rogers, devised a scheme which earned them a profit of $36 million. First, they purchased Anaconda Properties from Marcus Daly for $39 million, with the understanding that the check was to be deposited in the bank and remain there for a definite time (National City Bank was run by Rockefeller's friends). Rogers and Rockefeller then set up a paper organization, known as the Amalgamated Copper Mining Company, with their own clerks as dummy directors, saying the company was worth $75 million.

They had Amalgamated Copper Company buy Anaconda from them for $75 million in capital stock, which was conveniently printed for the purpose. Then, they borrowed $39 million from the bank using Amalgamated Copper as collateral. They paid back Daly for Anaconda and sold $75 million worth of stock in Amalgamated Copper to the public. They paid back the bank's $39 million and had a profit of $36 million in cash.

With help from banker John Dennis Ryan, Amalgamated acquired two large competitors, and soon controlled all the mines of Butte, Montana. By the late 1920s it had become Anaconda Copper Company and was the fourth-largest company in the world.

From 1912 to 1913, the Pujo Committee investigated Rockefeller and others for allegedly earning $30 million in profit through cornering the copper market and "synchronizing with artificially enforced activity" in Amalgamated Copper stock in the New York Stock Exchange.

When the newly formed Mutual Alliance Trust Company opened for business in New York on the Tuesday after June 29, 1902, there were 13 directors, including Emanuel Lehman and Rockefeller.

Personal life

Rockefeller married Almira Geraldine Goodsell (March 19, 1844 – January 17, 1920) on May 25, 1864 in Fairfield, Connecticut. There were many connections among this and other elite families. Her sister Esther Judson Goodsell was married to Oliver Burr Jennings, who became one of the original stockholders of Standard Oil. Together, William and Almira had:
Lewis Edward Rockefeller (March 2, 1865 – August 3, 1866)
Emma Rockefeller (June 8, 1868 – August 11, 1934), who married Dr. David Hunter McAlpin
William Goodsell Rockefeller (May 21, 1870 – November 30, 1922), who married Sarah Elizabeth "Elsie" Stillman
John Davison Rockefeller II (March 8, 1872 – 1877)
Percy Avery Rockefeller (February 27, 1878 – September 25, 1934), who married Isabel Goodrich Stillman
Ethel Geraldine Rockefeller (April 3, 1882 – August 13, 1973), who married Marcellus Hartley Dodge Sr.
William Rockefeller, Jr. died of pneumonia on June 24, 1922 in Rockwood Hall. He had caught a cold during a car trip he took with brother John and nephew John, Jr. to visit his childhood home in Richford, New York. He was interred in the Sleepy Hollow Cemetery, Sleepy Hollow, New York.

The New York Times, in discussing a trust that Rockefeller set up for his born and yet-to-be born great-grandchildren, stated that he "left a gross estate of $102,000,000 which was reduced to $50,000,000 principally by $30,000,000 of debts and $18,600,000 of inheritance and estate taxes."

Rockefeller was a regular attendee of the Saint Mary's Episcopal Church in Scarborough in the last few years of his life.

Family and descendants
Rockefeller and Almira's second son, William Goodsell Rockefeller, married Sarah Elizabeth "Elsie" Stillman, the elder daughter of James Jewett Stillman and Sarah Elizabeth Stillman; her father was National City Bank president. The new couple's family included James Stillman Rockefeller. He became a member of the Jekyll Island Club (aka The millionaires Club) on Jekyll Island, Georgia, along with J. P. Morgan, Joseph Pulitzer, and other business moguls of the day.

Residences

In 1886, Rockefeller bought property in Westchester County along the Hudson River from General Lloyd Aspinwall. He renovated or rebuilt the mansion Rockwood Hall.

The Rockefeller Cottage is a house on Jekyll Island, Georgia. It is also called Indian Mound and is next to the Jekyll Island Club. The house was built by Gordon McKay in 1892. McKay died in 1903 and the house was bought by William Rockefeller in 1905, who used it as a winter home. It was evacuated in 1942, along with the rest of the island. The house remained in the Rockefeller family until 1947, when the Jekyll Island Authority bought the property. It was open as a museum from 1950 until 1968, when it was closed for badly needed repairs. It is now a public museum. Decades later the former "Indian Mound" Cottage was listed on the National Register of Historic Places as Rockefeller Cottage.

References

External links

William Rockefeller Archives

American businesspeople in the oil industry
American financiers
Rockefeller family
Standard Oil
1841 births
1922 deaths
People from Butte, Montana
People from Briarcliff Manor, New York
Burials at Sleepy Hollow Cemetery
People from Strongsville, Ohio
American people of English descent
American people of German descent
American people of Scotch-Irish descent
Deaths from pneumonia in New York (state)
People from Richford, New York
Mutual Alliance Trust Company people
Baptists from New York (state)